The Hampshire Down or Hampshire is a British breed of sheep. It originated in about 1829 from cross-breeding of Southdowns with the Old Hampshire breed, the Wiltshire Horn and the Berkshire Nott, all horned, white-faced sheep — these were native to the open, untilled, hilly stretch of land known as the Hampshire Downs. It is much used as a terminal sire.

History 

John Twynam, a Hampshire farmer, crossed his then-Hampshire flock with Cotswold rams around 1829. The resultant half-bred rams were compact and blocky animals, and from around 1835 were sold into six or more of what were to become the first recognised pedigree Hampshire Down flocks in the United Kingdom. An important flock was kept at Downton Agricultural College in the late 19th-century.

The Southdowns had long dark brown or black legs, matured early, produced the best of mutton and a fine quality of medium wool. The original Hampshire was larger, coarser, but hardier, slower to mature, with inferior flesh, and a longer but coarser wool. The Southdown had always been remarkable for its power of transmitting its special characteristics to its progeny by other kinds of sheep, and hence it soon impressed its own characteristics on its progeny by the Hampshire. The horns of the original breed have disappeared; the face and legs have become dark, the frame has become more compact, the bones smaller, the back broader and straighter, the legs shorter, and the flesh and wool of better quality, while the superior hardiness and greater size, as well as the large head and Roman nose of the old breed, still remain. Hampshires of the 1890s matured early and fattened readily. They clipped from 6 to 7 pounds of wool, suitable for combing, which was longer than Southdown wool, but less fine.

The resultant mutton had a desirable proportion of fat and lean, and was juicy and fine flavoured; the lambs were large and were usually dropped early and fed for market. Indeed, the Hampshire may be considered a larger and trifle coarser and hardier Southdown. The breed was occasionally crossed with Cotswolds, when it produced a wool more valuable for worsted manufacturers than the pure Cotswold. In addition to Southdown, the Hampshire likely has a dash of Cotswold blood in its composition. Considerable importations of the breed were made to the United States in the 18th century, but it did not become so popular as the Southdown and some other English breeds.

Characteristics
Mature rams should weigh 300 pounds or more and mature ewes
should weigh 200 pounds or more in breeding condition. Mature ewes yield on average 6 lbs(2.7 kg) to 10 lbs (4.5 kg) fleece that is 25.0 to 33.0 microns and a spinning count of 46 to 58. The fleece staple length is 2.0 to 3.5 in (5-9 cm) with a yield of 50% to 62%.

References

 Text was derived from Scientific American Supplement, No. 623, 10 December 1887.

External links 
 The Domestic Sheep by Henry Stewart (1898), "The Hampshire Down" (with photos).
 American Hampshire Sheep Association
 Ohio Hampshire Sheep Association
 Hampshire, by Susan Schoenian, Sheep & Goat Specialist at the University of Maryland's Western Maryland Research & Education Center. 

1829 introductions
History of Hampshire
Culture in Hampshire
Sheep breeds
Sheep breeds originating in England